Anna James may refer to:

Anna James, a joint pseudonym used by American authors Madeline Porter and Shannon Harper, more commonly known by the pseudonym Madeline Harper
Anna Louise James (1886–1977), Connecticut pharmacist
Anna James (athlete), represented Wales in the 1978 IAAF World Cross Country Championships – Senior women's race
Anna James (diver), represented the United States at the 2011 World Aquatics Championships

See also
Anne James (disambiguation)